USS Vengeance has been the name of two ships in the United States Navy.

  was a former merchant ship that served under the command of John Paul Jones in the Revolutionary War.

  was used as a bomb ketch against the Barbary pirates in the early 19th century.

Citations

References
 

United States Navy ship names